Museums in Wallis and Futuna include:

 St Joseph's Church, Mala'efo'ou
 Talietumu archaeological site
 Tonga Toto archaeological site
 Uvea Museum Association

Buildings and structures in Wallis and Futuna
Lists of museums in Oceania
Wallis
museums